Alexandra is a subzone region located in the town of Bukit Merah, Singapore. The region comprises two non contiguous neighbourhoods: Alexendra Hill and Alexendra North. It is located along the road which the place had its name derived from, at the eastern border of the Queenstown district. 

Alexandra North, which refers to the precinct near Redhill MRT station, consists mainly of condominiums together with a park. Alexandra Hill, which is often referred to as Brickworks Estate or Rumah Tinggi, mainly consists of HDB flats and is also home to an IKEA showroom. There is also a shopping centre in the district which recently opened its doors in 2016, Alexandra Central, beside the IKEA building. 

There is also the historical Alexandra Hospital, located near the region.

See also
Kim Seng Road

References
 https://web.archive.org/web/20090302092032/http://infopedia.nl.sg/articles/SIP_741_2005-01-20.html
 https://web.archive.org/web/20111008002706/http://heritagetrails.sg/content/915/Alexandra_Road.html

Geography of Singapore